Mongrédien is a surname. Notable people with the surname include:

 Augustus Mongredien (1807–1888), British political economist
 Jean Mongrédien, French musicologist